The Matthew Baird Mansion is an historic home, now apartment building, located at 814 N. Broad Street, in the Francisville neighborhood of Philadelphia, Pennsylvania.  It was built in 1863–1864, and is a four-story, five bay, brownstone faced brick building with 19 rooms in a Late Victorian-style. The mansion consists of the main building, an attached three-story brick back building, and a two-story brick stable.  It was built by Matthew Baird (1817–1877), one of the early partners in the Baldwin Locomotive Works.

It was added to the National Register of Historic Places in 1983.

References

Houses on the National Register of Historic Places in Philadelphia
Houses completed in 1864
Lower North Philadelphia